Francis Narh (born 18 April 1994) is a Ghanaian footballer who plays as a winger for Dinamo Samarqand.

Club career

Baník Ostrava
In early 2014 Narh signed for the Czech team Baník Ostrava. He made his debut for the team on 22 March 2014, coming on as a substitute in the 90 minute against Sparta Prague.

Levski Sofia
On 9 January 2016, Narh joined Bulgarian side Levski Sofia, signing a three-year deal. He scored his first goal for Levski in a game against PFC Pirin Blagoevgrad. On 21 July 2016, he scored the opener for Levski in the Europa League 2nd qualifying round second leg match against Maribor, but in an eventual 1–1 draw which eliminated Levski from the tournament as Maribor advanced to the next round on away goals. On 23 November 2017, he was released from the club due to poor sport condition and systematically non-serious attitude towards the training process.

Slavia Mozyr
Narh signed a contract with Belarusian club Slavia Mozyr in the summer of 2019.

Dinamo Samarqand
On 22 February 2023, Dinamo Samarqand announced the signing of Narh to a one-year contract.

International career
In June 2013, Narh was named in manager Sellas Tetteh's 21-man squad for the 2013 FIFA U-20 World Cup. He made his debut on 21 June in the opening group-stage game, a 3–1 loss against France U20.

Career statistics

Club

References

External links

 Profile at LevskiSofia.info

1994 births
Living people
Ghanaian footballers
Footballers from Accra
Association football forwards
Ghana under-20 international footballers
Ghanaian expatriate footballers
Expatriate footballers in Tunisia
Expatriate footballers in the Czech Republic
Expatriate footballers in Bulgaria
Expatriate footballers in Cyprus
Expatriate footballers in Turkey
Expatriate footballers in Belarus
Expatriate footballers in Uzbekistan
Tunisian Ligue Professionnelle 1 players
Czech First League players
First Professional Football League (Bulgaria) players
Cypriot First Division players
Belarusian Premier League players
Tema Youth players
Club Africain players
FC Baník Ostrava players
PFC Levski Sofia players
Doxa Katokopias FC players
Kardemir Karabükspor footballers
FC Slavia Mozyr players
FC Bunyodkor players